Amanda Carol Barnett (born September 28, 1975) is an American country music singer and stage actress.

Early life and music career
Barnett has been singing since she was a child, performing at churches, local venues, as well as at Dollywood. In her musical career, she has released eight albums and charted three singles on the Billboard country charts. Her highest-charting country single is "Now That's All Right With Me", which reached No. 43 in 1996. Barnett has also held the titular role in the musical Always… Patsy Cline, a musical based on the life of Patsy Cline, which opened in 1994 at the Ryman Auditorium in Nashville.  She has performed the role in nearly 500 performances over a 20-year period. In addition, she has been a regular on the Grand Ole Opry, appearing over 400 times since her debut in 1994. In 2019, Rolling Stone Magazine named Barnett's recording of "The Whispering Wind" as one of the top songs of 1999, ranking it at 74 out of 99 songs. Barnett performs with bands and symphonies around the world, including the Nashville Symphony and Detroit Symphony Orchestra. On August 13, 2019, Barnett made her cabaret debut at Feinstein's/54 Below in New York City. Barnett, along with Garth Brooks, Emmylou Harris, Vince Gill and others performed at the 2019 Musicians Hall of Fame and Museum Concert and Induction Ceremony; among the inductees were producer Owen Bradley, Steve Wariner and Alabama.  Barnett's rendition of the Skeeter Davis classic "The End of The World" was released as a single on October 18, 2019. The single was subsequently included on an album titled "A Nashville Songbook" released in August 2020. On September 28, 2020 The Tennessee Department of Tourist Development honored Barnett with the unveiling of a “Tennessee Music Pathways” marker at the historic downtown square in her Tennessee hometown of Crossville. Barnett released her eighth studio album on May 7, 2021 titled "Every Star Above", paying tribute to Billie Holiday's "Lady in Satin." It was the final album orchestrated by Sammy Nestico prior to his death.  The album reached number one on the iTunes Jazz Charts one day after its release, and it was named one of the best albums of 2021 by Variety magazine. On September 28, 2021 Barnett was invited by Connie Smith to become an official member of the Grand Ole Opry, and was formally inducted by Smith and Marty Stuart on November 2, 2021. To date, she has made over 500 appearances at the Grand Ole Opry.

Discography

Albums

Singles

Guest singles

Guest appearances

Recordings with other artists

Videos

Music videos

| 2021
| I Love a Rainy Night

References

External links
 Official site

1975 births
American country singer-songwriters
American women country singers
Living people
Asylum Records artists
People from Crossville, Tennessee
Singer-songwriters from Tennessee
21st-century American women singers
Country musicians from Tennessee
Thirty Tigers artists